Harrah is the name of a village in Fujairah, part of the United Arab Emirates (UAE).

Populated places in the Emirate of Fujairah